Cibórz  is a settlement in the administrative district of Gmina Skąpe, within Świebodzin County, Lubusz Voivodeship, in western Poland. It is situated on the shore of Lake Ciborze.

The settlement has a population of 968.

Cibórz is the location of the largest psychiatric hospital in the Lubusz Voivodeship.

During World War II, the Germans operated the Oflag III-B prisoner-of-war camp for Belgian officers in the settlement.

References

Populated lakeshore places in Poland
Villages in Świebodzin County